The Pinball Hall of Fame is a museum located in Las Vegas, Nevada.

Pinball Hall of Fame may also refer to:

Pinball Hall of Fame: The Gottlieb Collection, a 2004 pinball video game by FarSight Studios
Pinball Hall of Fame: The Williams Collection, a 2007 pinball video game by FarSight Studios
The Pinball Arcade, the Nintendo 3DS version of this pinball video game that only includes tables with non-emulated displays